Jonathan Baron is an American psychologist. He is a professor emeritus of psychology at the University of Pennsylvania in the science of decision-making.

Life and career
Baron was born in Boston, Massachusetts, in 1944, and received a B.A. in psychology from Harvard in 1966 and a Ph.D. from Michigan in 1970 for thesis titled The threshold for successiveness. He married Judith Baron in 1967, and has one son, David, born in 1980.

Baron is the founding editor of the open-access journal Judgment and Decision Making and has been on the editorial boards of several other journals. He is a Fellow of the American Association for the Advancement of Science and of the Association for Psychological Science, and was the President of the Society for Judgment and Decision Making for 2006–2007.

Notable contributions
Baron's work has occurred primarily within the field of judgment and decision making, a multi-disciplinary area that applies psychology to problems in economics, law, business, and public policy. This field began by contrasting human decision behavior to theories of individual decision making and judgment such as probability theory and expected utility.  Baron's research has extended the focus of judgment and decision making to social problems of resource allocation and ethical decisions. Among the concepts associated with his work are omission bias (the tendency for people to excuse acts of omission more easily than acts of commission) and protected values (principles on which people are unwilling to accept trade-offs).

Baron is author of Thinking and Deciding, a text that takes on the task of examining  psychological research directed at a comprehension of the nature of thinking as he sees it. In this text, Baron covers such topics as risk, bioethics, Bayes' Theorem, utility measurement, decision analysis, and values. The text takes a broad-based, introductory-level view to the field of psychological decision theory.

He has also authored Morality and Rational Choice, Against Bioethics, and Judgment Misguided.

Additionally, he is the editor of Teaching Decision Making to Adolescents and Psychological Perspectives on Justice (with Barbara Mellers).

Baron's Ph.D. students have included Rebecca Treiman, Hal Pashler and Jonathan Haidt.

References

External links
Website

1944 births
Harvard College alumni
Living people
University of Michigan alumni
University of Pennsylvania faculty
20th-century American psychologists
21st-century American psychologists